Les marchands de rêves is a 2005 studio album of Corneille that became the most successful of his albums reaching #3 in the French Albums Chart.

In 2006, the album was rereleased as a package Parce qu'on vient de loin / Les marchands de rêves with the debut studio album of Corneille Parce qu'on vient de loin

Track listing
 "Reposez en paix"
 "Lettre à la maison blanche"
 "Si tu savais"
 "Sur la tombe de mes gens"
 "Petite sœur"
 "Le bon Dieu est une femme"
 "Les marchands de rêves"
 "Notre jour viendra"
 "A vie"
 "Iwacu"
 "Toujours le même"
 "Ca arrive"
 "Quand on aime tant"
 "Viens"

References

2005 albums
Corneille (singer) albums